In baseball statistics, hits per run (H/R), also known as hit conversion rate (HCR) is the ratio between hits and runs scored. It is the average number of hits it takes to score a run. H/R is the measure of the effectiveness of hitting in scoring a run. Teams having a lower hits-to-run ratio would likely have a good offense and could be expected to win more games.

For example, the 1927 New York Yankees, who had a record of 110–44 and are considered one of the greatest teams in Major League Baseball (MLB) history, had 1644 hits and scored 976 runs—a ratio of 1.68 hits per runs. Conversely, the 1916 Philadelphia Athletics, who had a record of 36–117 and are considered one of the worst teams, had 1212 hits and scored 447 runs—a ratio of 2.71 hits per run.

Between 2008 and 2017, the average hits-to-run ratio in MLB (based on total hits and runs made by all teams during each regular season) varied between 1.87 (2017) and 2.08 (2013), meaning that it generally takes MLB teams about two hits to score a run.

References

Baseball statistics